LabPlot is a free software and cross-platform computer program for interactive scientific graphing and data analysis, written for the KDE desktop. It is similar to Origin and is able to import Origin's data files.

History and perspective
LabPlot was initiated by Stefan Gerlach, a scientist and IT administrator at the University of Konstanz. He separately published liborigin, a library for reading OriginLab OPJ project files.

In 2008, developers of LabPlot and SciDAVis (another Origin clone, forked from QtiPlot) "found their project goals to be very similar" and "decided to start a close cooperation" with the aim of merging their code into a common backend, while maintaining "two frontends, one with full KDE4 integration (called LabPlot 2.x) and one with no KDE dependencies (pure Qt) for easier cross-platform use (called SciDAVis)".

In September 2016, LabPlot moved its website from labplot.sourceforge.net to labplot.kde.org.

Features
It is  scriptable using Qt Script for Applications (QSA). 2D and 3D plots of data can be rendered in a "worksheet", either by directly reading datafiles or from a spreadsheet, which LabPlot supports. It has interfaces to several libraries, including GSL for data analysis, the Qwt3d libraries for 3D plotting using OpenGL, FFTW for fast Fourier transforms and supports exporting to 80 image formats and raw PostScript. Other key features include live data plotting, support for the FITS format, for LaTeX and Rich Text labels, data masking, data picking from images, multiple plots in the same worksheet, pie charts, bar charts/histograms, interpolation, data smoothing, peak fitting, nonlinear curve fitting, regression, deconvolution, integral transforms, and others (see developers website listed below for details). The interface is translated in various languages.

LabPlot uses the Qt widget set for its graphical interface. Under Linux it is integrated with the KDE desktop and has drag and drop support with KDE's applications. Since version 2.5 LabPlot is also available for Windows.

See also

 List of information graphics software
 Comparison of numerical-analysis software

References

Free educational software
Free plotting software
Free software programmed in C
Free software programmed in C++
KDE software
Plotting software
Regression and curve fitting software
Software that uses Qt